

Early years
Black participated in high school football for Ada High School. At Ada High School he won an all-state award.

College career
Black played for the East Central University Tigers from 2011 to 2013. In 2012, he received an All-GAC Honorable Mention, and in 2013, he made the Don Hansen All-Super Region Three Third-team and was an All-GAC First-team selection.

Professional career

Chicago Bears
Black signed with the Chicago Bears on May 3, 2015 after going undrafted in the 2015 NFL Draft. On September 5, 2015, he was released by the Bears.

Los Angeles KISS
On November 13, 2015, Black was assigned to the Los Angeles KISS of the Arena Football League. On February 3, 2016, the KISS placed Black on Other league exempt list. The KISS activated Black on May 10, 2016. On July 7, 2016, Black was placed on reassignment. On July 11, 2016, Black was assigned to the KISS.

BC Lions
Black signed with the BC Lions of the Canadian Football League on February 25, 2016. On May 5, 2016, Black was released.

Baltimore Brigade
Harris was assigned to the Baltimore Brigade on January 17, 2017.

References

External links

Chicago Bears bio 
East Central Tigers bio

Living people
1992 births
Players of American football from Oklahoma
American football defensive backs
Canadian football defensive backs
African-American players of American football
African-American players of Canadian football
Chicago Bears players
East Central Tigers football players
Los Angeles Kiss players
BC Lions players
People from Pontotoc County, Oklahoma
Baltimore Brigade players